The Open Court Reading Program is a core Language arts/English series used in a large number of elementary schools classrooms.  It was one of two reading programs adopted for use in California  schools when textbooks were last chosen in 2002.  The other was Houghton-Mifflin Reading. For the 2008 Edition, Open Court Reading's name was changed to Imagine It!.

The series is published by McGraw-Hill Education.

There is both praise and criticism of the program among educators.  Proponents of Open Court Reading believe that its focus on phonics and reading comprehension strategy use, both taught with very explicit instruction, benefit children.  Some critics dislike the explicit nature of instruction, suggesting that it leaves little room for child exploration or teacher creativity, as constructivist models of reading instruction such as whole language.

References

External links
Official website of SRA/McGraw-Hill, Open Court Reading publisher.
Open Court Resources.com, largest collection of free Open Court Reading Resources on the internet created by and for Open Court Reading teachers
A Yahoo Discussion Board created by teachers of Open Court Reading to share ideas for teaching the program.
 US Department of Education, What Works Clearinghouse, WWC Intervention Report, August 2012, "Adolescent Literacy: Open Court Reading", http://ies.ed.gov/ncee/wwc/interventionreport.aspx?sid=568
 Borman, G.D., Dowling, N.M. and Schneck, C. (2008) Educational Evaluation and Policy Analysis, 30(4), 389–407.

Phonics curricula
United States
Basal readers
Reading (process)